The APF Imagination Machine is a combination home video game console and home computer system released by APF Electronics Inc. in late 1979. It has two separate components, the APF-M1000 game system, and an add-on docking bay with full sized typewriter keyboard and tape drive. The APF-M1000 was built specifically to compete with the Atari 2600.

Specifications
CPU: 8-bit 0.89 MHz Motorola 6800 (3.579 MHz Oscillator divided by 4)
ROM: 14 KB
RAM: 9 KB expandable to 17 KB (8 KB / 16 KB + 1 KB)
Video Display Controller: MC6847
Resolutions: 256×192×4 / 128×192×8
Colors: 8
One sound channel in 5 octaves
Two controllers:
13 buttons
0-9 numeric keypad
Clear and End key
Trigger
4-way joystick

Overview

APF Basic
The bundled APF BASIC interpreter allows any users to develop their own programs. Most retailers of the system offered a full and hefty instruction manual to explain how the specialized code works, and a tech sheet that specifies every function of every chip on the console, so as to allow the users to make the most efficient code possible. To encourage more home users to create their own games and trade them, a monthly mailing list lasted well through the video game crash of 1983 and into the next generation of consoles.

Special cassette
One of the most marketed features of the console is the dual-sided cassette drive that allows the user to write or use a stored program, and also to record or play audio. The feature is generally used for programmers to leave notes about their work, or for instructions to be read aloud before a game is played.

Peripherals
The console has a number of aftermarket add-ons:
RS-232 Storage Cartridge
Floppy Disk Storage
8K RAM Cartridge
Mini Floppy Disk Storage
Telephone Modem
It has a hub of sorts, generally called the "building block", which allows for the connection of some standard computer accessories.

Games
In addition to the one BASIC interpreter cartridge bundled with the system, only 15 official game cartridges were ever released by APF Electronics Inc, although several cartridges contain multiple games. Many games were created by an active programming community of owners and distributed through the monthly newsletter, released on cassette tape or printout.

The official game list is as follows:
Artist and Easel
Backgammon
Baseball
Blackjack
Bowling / Micro Match
Boxing
Brickdown / Shooting Gallery
Budget Manager
Casino
Catena
Hangman / Tic-Tac-Toe / Doodle
Pinball / Dungeon Hunt / Blockout
Rocket Patrol
Space Destroyers
UFO / Sea Monster / Break it down / Rebuild / Shoot

APF IM-2 console
APF had planned on releasing a follow up to the original M1000 Imagination Machine game console, but went out of business just before the console could go to market. No official specs have ever been released, although some former employees have mentioned that it was essentially the same M1000 core with typical upgrades.

Development
The impetus for the Imagination Machine was to beat to market Atari's preannounced but never-launched plans to extend the Atari 2600 to become a home computer. The design was inspired by reverse engineering the TRS-80, Commodore PET, and Apple II home computers. Working directly with Fairchild Semiconductor, the team got much of its I/O design from Andy Grove. The engineering department wanted to make the design modular for optional expansion, but the marketing department wanted to bundle some features, so the preliminary result was an integrated cassette tape drive. This was removed when, three months later, the first floppy drives appeared on the market which were a superior storage technology.

Reception
But it's the whole system that's exciting. If what you want is just a video game, you may as well stick with Atari." Mechanix Illustrated in October 1980 called the system "one smart television that's inexpensive, completely programmable, and easy to use". The magazine praised its large RAM and ROM capacities, and called it the first computer that can let the user store new data on the same cassette as the application.

References

External links
 Ed Smith and the Imagination Machine
 Home Computer and Video Game Museum - APF Imagination Machine
 The Trailing Edge APF Page
 Universal Videogame List - APF Imagination Machine Game List
 OLD-COMPUTERS.COM museum ~ APF Imagination Machine entry
 Video Game Console Library database.
 TheGameConsole.com database
 APF Consoles and Computers discussion group, on Yahoo Groups

Second-generation video game consoles
Home computers
Products introduced in 1979
68xx-based computers